Tulu Gowda and Arebhashe Gowda (Gauda) are primarily found in South Canara District, Kodagu District, Indian state of Karnataka and Bandadka village of Kasaragod. They are a subsect of the Vokkaliga community but are culturally and linguistically different. They speak Tulu and Arebhashe.

History 
They were originally called Natha Pantha and Shaivas, owing allegiance to Sringeri Matha. During Emperor Vishnuvardhana’s rule, they became Vaishnavites and worshiped Tirupati Venkataramana (Balaji of Tirupati) and Sabbakka (Sharada of Sringeri). They then settled in the Mangalore-Udupi (Dakshina Kannada-Udupi) region where they spoke the Tulu language. They are said to have 10 Kutumba and 18 Bari as their primordial root families, from which a Nūru Mane or "hundred families" arose. Many of these families settled in Kodagu from the time of Talakadu Gangas (200 – 1004 CE). They then migrated to Coorg (Kodagu) from the Mangalore-Udupi (Dakshina Kannada-Udupi) region, to settle among the Canarese (Kannada) speaking peoples.

Community system 
They have a somewhat elaborate system of caste government. In every village there are two headmen, the Grāma Gowda and the  ottu Gauda. For every group of eight or nine villages there is another head called the Māganē Gauda, and for every nine Māganēs there is a yet higher authority called the Kattēmanēyava.

Domestic culture

Marriage system 
The caste is divided into eighteen baris or balis, which are of the usual exogamous character, same bari men, women not to marry, they belongs to close cousins.

In Dakshina Kannada both the groups of Gowdas Tulu and 'Arebhashe' do not prepare meat or any Non Vegetarian food during marriage and Gruhaprevesha (House warming functions. Tulu Gowdas of Puttur Seeme invariably conduct Marriage and Gruha Pravesha as per Vaidhika Practice.  

At the time of Marriage, bridegroom's father offers ₹10¼  to the girls parents out of this ₹6¼ is to be sent to Gurumaṭha (Sringeri Matha) through Ūra gauḍa for Girls Mutheidegu (for seeking longer life for the couple). Oora Gowda thus collects such offering during the Marriages held under his jurisdiction and hands over the same to Maagane Gowda and through him to Kattemane. Kattemane Gowda takes it over to Guru Matha (Sringeri Matha) once in a year and seeks blessings from Maṭhādhipati on behalf of married couple. Oora Gowda occupies an important position in all JEEVANAVARTHANA PRACTICES of Tulu Gowdas of Puttur region. In his absence Othu Gowda takes over his responsibility. Gowdas follow Patriarchial succession procedure. Eldest male member in the Joint family is the Head of the family. Ūra gauḍa of the village is nominated by Kattemane Head. In all functions starting from "Veelya Shastra" (Engagement) up to the marriage the Ūra gauḍa recites an Invocation and Declaration in loud voice which states as 
Transliteration in Tulu
 
In English
 
At this moment the gathered relatives and public will declare their assent saying "Edde Karyo Panpere" (a good work-ritual). This Declaration is same as the recital in Sullia and Kodagu region which is in Kannada. Here the reference to "Aramane and Gurumane" is essentially to Royalty of Ikkeri and Sringeri Mathadhipathies respectively.

Generally there is no 'Dowry' system among Gowda clan on the other hand Boys father offers a Kanya shulka to Girls parents a sum of ₹16¼.

Bari Paddati 
The caste is divided into eighteen baris or balis, which are of the usual exogamous character. The names of some of these are as follows: Bangāra (gold), Nandara, Malāra (a bundle of glass bangles, as carried about for sale), Sālu, Hemmana (pride or conceit), Kabru, Gōli (Portulaca oleracea, a pot-herb), Basruvōgaru (basru, belly), Balasanna, Kabar, Gundana, Chalyera, Mulyera, Nayera and Karbannāya.

Arsaya 
Once a year, mostly in the tulu month of Kaarthel (June–July), the Gowdas perform a ceremony for the propitiation of all deceased ancestors. They have a special preference for Venkatarāmaswāmi, to whom they make money offerings once a year in September. It should be reach Tirupati as an offering, which mostly includes coins, pepper, rupee notes.

Indian Freedom movement 

The Arebhashe Gowdas and Tulu Gowdas were historically involved in a rebellion against British rule in Canara and Coorg. Guddemane Appaiah Gowda, whose family was given lands in Kodagu, along with others from Kodagu and Kedambadi Ramaiah Gowda from Sulya rebelled against the British and hoisted Jangama (Lingayite monk) Kalyanaswamy's flag in Bavuta Gudde in Mangalore and ruled for 13 days. This was one of the earliest Indian independence struggles against British rule 1834.

Notes

References

Further reading

External links 

Social groups of Karnataka
Ethnic groups in Karnataka
Vokkaliga
People from Dakshina Kannada district
Tuluva
Hindu communities